The Institute of Chartered Chemists of Nigeria (ICCON) is a professional regulatory body, established by Decree 91 of 1993 (now ICCON ACT, CAP I.12 LFN 2004). It is statutorily charged with the responsibility of regulating the teaching, learning and best practice of Chemistry profession in Nigeria. ICCON is a parastatal of the Federal Ministry of Health (FMoH).

History

Creation 
Since 1946 when the first chemistry graduate, the late Professor Stephen Oluwole Awokoya, earned his B.Sc. from the University of London, the country has produced generations of chemists for various sectors of the economy. However, there was yet no government recognized regulatory body to regulate the practice of chemists in Nigeria.

The agitation by Nigerian chemists to get certification can be traced back to the early 1980s. This clamour, which was mainly under the aegis of the Chemical Society of Nigeria (CSN), reached a climax in 1992 when the CSN, under the Presidency of a renowned environmental chemist, Prof. Oladele Osibanjo mandated one of its founding fathers and senior Fellow, Daniel Alifa Akoh, to prepare a position paper to be presented to the Federal Government, outlining the role of chemists in Nigeria's socio-economic development.

The decade–long campaign finally bore fruit in 1993 when Decree 91 establishing ICCON was signed into law by erstwhile military President, General Ibrahim Babangida. Subsequently, the institute's first Governing Council was elected during the Annual International Conference of the CSN in Warri, in 1995. This pioneer Council was under the Chairmanship of Professor of Analytical and Environmental Chemistry, Prof. Oladele Osibanjo.

Establishment 
Though established in 1993, ICCON could not take off until 2003 when its first substantive Registrar, Gladys Eke was appointed. This was because the military regime of General Sani Abacha suspended the operations of all Boards / Governing Councils of all Federal parastatals in the country. The first Governing Council that was elected in 1995 was only inaugurated in April 2001 after the return to civil rule in Nigeria, under the Olusegun Obasanjo regime. The inauguration was performed by the then Minister of Health, Prof. A.B.C Nwosu.

Sequel to the dissolution of all Boards of Federal parastatals in 2004, ICCON's second Governing Council headed by Harry Okolo was inaugurated on 5 September 2006. A 3rd Governing Council, inaugurated on 29 January 2010 by the then Minister of Health, Prof. Babatunde Osotimehin, was led by Prof. Abdullahi A. Zuru. This third Council appointed the institute's second substantive Registrar, Prince Jay O. Oghifo, FICCON, FCSN who assumed office on 2 August 2010 following the retirement of Eke in 2009. In the interval between Eke's retirement and Prince Oghifo's appointment, ICCON Secretariat was administered by an acting Registrar/CEO, Taiwo O. Bammodu, FICCON, MCSN.

On 6 February 2014, a Council-elect came into being via an election conducted by an Extraordinary General Meeting held in Lagos. The council, the fourth in the institute's history, Chaired by Professor F.E. Okieimen was inaugurated by the then Minister of Health Professor Isaac A. Adewole. ICCON secretariat is currently administered by Chemist Jwalshik Wilford, FICCON, FCSN, Chem Amb. (ACS) who was appointed by the current Governing Board of the institute, as the third substantive Registrar of the institute. The Registrar/CEO took over the administration of the institute on 1 June 2018, from the then acting Registrar/CEO, F. M. Kujore, FICCON.

The Federal Government of Nigeria confirmed the appointment of Wilford Zungkat Jwalshik as the substantive Registrar/CEO of the Institute of Chartered Chemists of Nigeria, ICCON, on 1 June 2018 making him the third substantive Registrar/CEO since the inception of the institute.

ICCON is now a full-fledged Institute with a little over 3,000 inducted Members and Fellows from different spheres of Chemistry practice, including the late President Umaru Musa Yar'Adua, FICCON, a renowned Chemist who was inducted into the Fellowship of the institute on 13 May 2008 at a colourful ceremony held at State House, Aso Villa, Abuja.

The institute's corporate headquarters from inception was located at Kofo Abayomi street, Victoria Island Lagos. It was through the effort of the pioneer Registrar/CEO Gladys Eke, FICCON, that saw the institute's Head office moved from Kofo Abayomi street in Victoria Island Lagos, to the former WHO Building on 443, Herbert Macaulay Way, Yaba, Lagos State.

However, in compliance with the Federal Government's directive, that all Ministries, Departments and Agencies should site their Headquarters in the Federal Capital Territory, the Institute by the approval of the governing council, and through the leadership of the current Registrar/ CEO, Chemist Jwalshik Wilford, FICCON, FCSN, finally relocated the headquarters to its present location at Rooms 3A, 3.30-3.36, 3rd Floor, Phase 1, Annex A, Federal Secretariat Complex, Shehu Shagari way, Abuja on 7 January 2019.

The Secretariat is administered by a registrar/CEO who oversees a team of professionals (chemists and non-chemists) that constitute the staff.

Objectives

Vision 
To recreate situations around us that will impact positively on the nation, while providing professional protection to our members.

Mission 

 To put in place regulatory framework/strategies for the practice of the Chemistry profession.
 To define the roles and responsibilities of the professional Chemists and their place in the society
 To bring to light how Nigeria's economy can be recreated positively through Chemistry.

Administration

Governing Council 
The Governing Council is the apex decision-making organ of the Institute and is headed by a Chairman who is also the President of the institute.
 President/Chairman - Professor F. E. Okieimen
 Vice President/Vice Chairman - Professor S. A. Saidu
 Registrar/Secretary - Jwalshik Z. Wilford
 Member - Professor A. A. Zuru, (Immediate Past President)
 Member - Professor Y. N. Lohdip
 Member - Professor B. G. Kolo
 Member - Professor O. B. Familoni
 Member - Professor J. M. Nwaedozie
 Member - W. N. Kwazu
 Member -  S. Akpa
 Member - M. D. Amaefule
 Member - T. O. Aaron
 Member - A. Aliyu-Bashir
 Member - M. O. Owoo

Membership 
The institute has so far admitted into its membership over 3,000 professionals from different spheres of chemistry practice, including the late President Umaru Musa Yar'Adua, a renowned chemist who was admitted into the Fellowship of the institute on 13 May 2008 at a colourful ceremony held at State House, Aso Villa Abuja, Nigeria.

Categories 
There are five categories of membership:
 Fellow
 Honorary Fellow
 Member
 Corporate Member
 Honorary Member

Chartered chemists

A Chartered Chemist is a person who, having obtained the requisite academic qualifications and satisfied the criteria set by the institute's Governing Council, has been formally inducted into and enrolled in the register of ICCON.

Qualifications for membership 
An intending member of the Institute should possess a minimum of a bachelor's degree or Higher National Diploma (HND) in Chemistry or a Chemistry-related discipline, such as Biochemistry, Food Science and Technology, Science Laboratory Technology (Chemistry Option), Science Education (Chemistry Option), or Chemical Engineering.

The modalities for obtaining registration forms, as well as the attendant fees, are as approved by the Governing Council from time to time. Current information in this regard is obtainable from the institute's Secretariat and its website.

Professional qualifying examination

The professional qualifying examination for admission into the institute is based on syllabus approved by the council from time to time. Similarly, modalities for upgrading of membership categories are determined by the Governing Council and may be reviewed from time to time.

Professional recognition/protection

As a body established by law, the statutory mandates of ICCON, in addition to regulating the professional practice of chemists, include the provision of professional "shield" for its members. ICCON thus seeks to protect the interests of registered chemists in corporate organizations, in the public service as well as in private practice. This protection may be in terms of the welfare of chemical personnel in various forms of employment, career enhancement etc. The institute also seeks recognition for its members in the comity of professionals.

Members of the Institute enjoy the privilege of carrying ICCON appellations after their names [FICCON, MICCON and FICCON (H)] according to their category of membership; this makes for easy recognition among members as well as in distinguishing members from non-members

Designatory letters

A member of the institute is entitled to use the following designatory letters after his/her name according to the category of membership:

MICCON - Member of the Institute of Chartered Chemists of Nigeria

FICCON - Fellow of the Institute of Chartered Chemists of Nigeria

FICCON (H) - Honorary Fellow of the Institute of Chartered Chemists of Nigeria

MICCON (H) – Honorary Member of the Institute of Chartered Chemists of Nigeria

MICCON (C) - Corporate Member of the Institute of Chartered Chemists of Nigeria

Annual dues

Annual dues are applicable to all categories of members, except the Honorary Fellows. The dues for each category of membership are determined by the council and are renewable annually. Payment for dues or any form payment can be made online.

Renewal of membership

Members of the Institute are required to renew their membership by satisfying the criteria set by the Governing Council. Such criteria include the payment of annual dues and attendance to the institute's Mandatory Continuing Professional Development (MCPD) training programmes. The minimum frequency of attendance at the MCPD programmes required for continued validity of membership is determined by the council from time to time.

Mandatory Continuing Professional Development Programmes (MCPD)

This is one of the requirements for the continued validity of membership of the institute, and is essentially meant to keep members abreast of current trends in the world of chemistry, as well as provide technical information aimed at professional career enhancement of members. The frequency of such programmes is as determined by the Governing Council.

Notable members
 Jwalshik Wilford
 Prof. Sunday Olawale Okeniyi
 Professor Stephen Oluwole Awokoya
 Professor Oluwole Babafemi Familoni
 Professor Gabriel Babatunde Ogunmola
 Adekunle Muhammed Olusuyi

References

External links 
 Official website

Professional associations based in Nigeria
1993 establishments in Nigeria